Selena Zhao (born 10 May 1998) is a Canadian competitive figure skater. She is the 2015 Canadian Junior Champion.

Personal life and Education 
Zhao was born in the United States and holds a dual citizenship as an American and Canadian. Her parents were born in Beijing, China before emigrating to Vancouver, where her father earned his PhD. They eventually moved to Ottawa, where Zhao's older brother, Davis, was born. The family later settled in Kirkland, Washington for Zhao's father's job, where she was eventually born. In 2012, Zhao moved to Chicago, before relocating in 2013 to Colorado Springs, where she trained from 2013-2016. During this time, she attended Cheyenne Mountain High School as a top student in her classes, winning a department award in mathematics. Zhao now studies political science and biology at Harvard University as a member of the Class of 2020. She also performs in the annual cancer research fundraiser show, An Evening with Champions.

Career

Early career
Zhao began skating at the age of four. She landed her first triple at the age of twelve, and mastered all of them a year later.

In the 2008-2009 season, Zhao won her regional competition and qualified for the U.S. Junior Figure Skating Championships on the juvenile level, where she placed 9th. A year later, at the intermediate level, Zhao once again won regionals to qualify for the U.S. Junior Figure Skating Championships on the intermediate level. The following season, Zhao repeated her win at regionals on the intermediate level and competed for the third time at the U.S. Junior Figure Skating Championships.

In the 2011-12 season, Zhao won regionals at the novice level by 21.07 points and placed fourth at sectionals to qualify for the 2012 U.S. Figure Skating Championships, where she placed seventh.

For the 2012-13 season, Zhao moved to Chicago to train with Kori Ade and Rohene Ward, coaches of 2014 US Olympian Jason Brown. She won the inaugural US Challenge Skate at the junior level, ahead of Polina Edmunds. Zhao won regionals by 45.37 points but placed 5th at sectionals, failing to qualify for the 2013 U.S. Figure Skating Championships.

Zhao began working with coaches Christy Krall and Damon Allen, at the age of fourteen, prior to the 2013-14 season. but failed to qualify for the 2014 U.S. Figure Skating Championships after placing 5th at sectionals.

2014-2015 season 
Zhao made her international debut on the ISU Junior Grand Prix during the 2014-15 figure skating season, representing Canada. Zhao finished 10th at her JGP event in Ljubljana, Slovenia and 9th at her JGP event in Dresden, Germany.

At the 2015 Canadian Junior Championships, Zhao overcame a prior foot injury, sustained while training a triple-triple jump combination, to win the gold medal by 13.34 points.

This earned her a spot for the 2015 World Junior Figure Skating Championships where she had the flu but competed anyway and placed 26th.

2015-2016 season 
Zhao made her senior debut at the 2015 U.S. International Classic, where she placed 5th.

Programs

Competitive highlights

References

1998 births
Living people
Canadian female single skaters
Canadian sportspeople of Chinese descent
Harvard College alumni